This is a list of the countesses of Eu, a French fief in the Middle Ages.

Countess of Eu

House of Normandy, 996–1246

House of Lusignan, 1219–1260

House of Brienne, 1260–1350

Raoul IV was accused of treason in 1350, and the county was confiscated. The county was then given to John of Artois.

House of Artois, 1352–1472

House of Burgundy-Nevers, 1472–1491

House of La Marck, 1491–1633

House of Guise, 1633–1660

House of Montpensier, 1660–1681
None

House of Bourbon, 1681–1821

House of Orléans, since 1793

First Creation

See also
Countess of Artois
Duchess of Nevers
Duchess of Guise
Duchess of Orléans
Duchess of Aumale

Sources
 Edmund Chester Waters, 'The Counts of Eu, Sometime Lords of the Honour of Tickhill', The Yorkshire Archaeological and Topographical Journal, No. 9 (1886).

 
Eu